Bilobella is a genus of springtails in the family Neanuridae. There are about 13 described species in Bilobella.

Species
These 13 species belong to the genus Bilobella:

 Bilobella albanica Cassagnau & Peja, 1979 g
 Bilobella aurantiaca b
 Bilobella braunerae Deharveng, 1981 g
 Bilobella coiffaiti Cassagnau, 1968 g
 Bilobella digitata Cassagnau, 1968 g
 Bilobella excolorata Loksa & Rubio, 1966 g
 Bilobella ligurica Deharveng, 1981 g
 Bilobella mahunkai g
 Bilobella massoudi Cassagnau, 1968 g
 Bilobella matsakisi Cassagnau, 1968 g
 Bilobella proxima Cassagnau & Peja, 1979 g
 Bilobella subaurantiaca Cassagnau & Peja, 1979 g
 Bilobella zekoi Cassagnau & Peja, 1979 g

Data sources: i = ITIS, c = Catalogue of Life, g = GBIF, b = Bugguide.net

References

Further reading

External links

 

Neanuridae
Springtail genera